Temple City High School (also known as TCHS) is a four-year comprehensive secondary school located in Temple City, California, in Los Angeles County. The high school was awarded the California Distinguished School award in 1996 and in 2019, and a California Gold Ribbon School award in 2017. Temple City High School was ranked #209 in the distinguished Newsweek list of America's Best High Schools.

History
The Temple City Unified School District was established on July 1, 1954, and incorporated Oak Avenue Intermediate School, a junior high school formerly part of the Pasadena Unified School District. Before 1956, Temple City public school students would attend Pasadena High School after Oak Avenue, but in 1956 the first 12th grade class in the district graduated at Oak Avenue. The first graduation from Temple City High was a year later, when the Associated Student Body established the green and gold school colors and the Ram as the school mascot. Temple City High School holds its annual graduation ceremonies at the school's Hitchcock-North Stadium in the evening and the Grad Night celebration takes place after the ceremonies on campus instead of holding it at a Southern California theme park.

Awards and recognition
Temple City High School has received several awards for its academic programs. Rampage, the school newspaper, was presented with the second place award for High School Newspaper Excellence in Division A by the Los Angeles Times at the Student Journalism Awards on May 26, 2005.

Temple City High School Yearbook: Templar
Over the years, Temple City's yearbook program has been both regionally and nationally recognized. The most prominent year was in 2007, where the Templar's 2005–06 edition yearbook, themed "It All Adds Up", received one of only six Columbia Scholastic Press Association "Gold Crown" awards in the nation. In 2009, the Templar received the "Herff Jones Yearbook Silver Crown" award for their 2007–08 edition yearbook entitled "Right Click". In 2009, at the East Los Angeles Journalism Education Association (ELAJEA) Write-Offs competition in Alhambra, the Templar also took home Grand Sweepstakes for accumulating the most points over a series of criteria that include Copywriting, Layout, and Pictures.

Athletics

Temple City High School competes interscholastically as a member of the Rio Hondo League in boys' and girls' baseball, basketball,  cross country, golf, marching band, soccer, swimming, tennis, track and field, volleyball, water polo, boys' football, Auxiliaries, cheer, pep flags, song, Choreo Dance Team, and Fusion Competitive Dance Team.

In 1973, the football team set the California Interscholastic Federation (CIF) Southern Section record for most consecutive wins, with 46. It also tied the California high school football state record.

Girls' volleyball won the CIF Southern Section championship in 2002, and girls' water polo won the CIF Section III championship back-to-back in 2003 and 2004, marking a consistent streak in girls' athletics.

The girls' tennis varsity tennis team secured a CIF win in 2016 and the boys' varsity baseball team won CIF championships in 2018.

Girls' golf has won the Rio Hondo League 4 years in a row starting with their inaugural season in 2018–2019.

Men's basketball won the Rio Hondo League in 2009.

Auxiliaries, cheer, pep flags, Song, Choreo, and Fusion have competed at various competition circuits including United Spirit Association and Sharp International. At Sharp International regionals, they have placed top three as well as overall first and sweepstakes in the categories of cheer, flags, song, lyrical, jazz, hip hop, and senior dance. In 2011 and 2012, Choreo and Fusion won back to back national champion titles in senior dance.  In 2013, Choreo and Fusion won national champs in lyrical dance and Song won national champs in pom.

Athletes who went on to play professionally from Temple City High School include Kent Kramer, Steve Busick, Jimmy Conrad, Bryan Jordan, Ryan Tucker, and Lee “Rocky” Biddle.

Performing and visual arts
Temple City High performing and visual arts consist of art, auxiliaries, band, dance, chorus, orchestra, and theatre. Dragonflicks, part of the school's art and film department, holds an annual Film Festival supported by the school during the months of
May and/or June. Their nationally recognized "co-ed" show choir team is named the Brighter Side Singers and they perform at Disney's California Adventures every Christmas season. The Brighter Side Singers also tour every year.

The Temple City Marching Band and Pageantry Corps—the "Pride of Temple City"—was invited to march in the 2004 Tournament of Roses Parade, because they had had one of their most successful marching seasons, earning 3 Sweepstakes Awards and 7 First Place Awards. Their appearance later led to an invitation to perform on The Ellen DeGeneres Show.

In 2005, the Temple City High School Symphony Orchestra was invited to New York to take part in the Youth Symphony Orchestra Competition in Carnegie Hall. They were awarded the Gold Plaque Award for their performance.

In 2008, the Temple City High School Honors Orchestra was invited to play in Disney's Concert Hall. They were invited due to the recognition of one of their students and cello players, Daniel Gee. He was recognized for his arrangement of George Gershwin's "Rhapsody in Blue".

In 2013, The Pride of Temple City Marching Band and Pageantry Corps was again selected to march in the 2015 Tournament of Roses Parade.

Notable alumni
 Kent Kramer, class of 1961, former tight end in the National Football League for the San Francisco 49ers, New Orleans Saints, Minnesota Vikings, and the Philadelphia Eagles
 Kent Cullers, class of 1967 valedictorian, the first totally blind physicist in the world and Director for NASA's Search for Extraterrestrial Intelligence R&D
 Reb Brown, class of 1967. Actor, Uncommon Valor, Yor, the Hunter from the Future, and Space Mutiny.
 Steve Busick, class of 1977, member of 1978 USC Trojans football team which earned UPI honors as national champion, also 7-year NFL career as a linebacker
 Steven W. Lindsey, class of 1978, is a United States Air Force Colonel and NASA astronaut
Angela Morales, class of 1985, is a writer/essayist, author of The Girls in My Town, and winner of the PEN Diamonstein-Spielvogel Award for the Art of the Essay. 
 Steve Jablonsky, class of 1988, composer and music director.  Music Director for Desperate Housewives and Transformers movies
Erin Martin, class of 1993, professional soccer player; national record holder (most career goals), National Soccer Hall of Fame
Jimmy Conrad, class of 1994, made the U.S. roster for the 2006 FIFA World Cup, defender for the Kansas City Wizards
 Lee "Rocky" Biddle, class of 1994, former MLB relief pitcher for the Expos and White Sox.
Rico Harris, class of 1995, former Harlem Globetrotter who disappeared in 2014
 Joseph Meehan, class of 1997, professional wrestler
Bryan Jordan, class of 2003, midfielder for the San Jose Earthquakes and formerly for the Los Angeles Galaxy
 Ryan Tucker, class of 2005, Major League Baseball pitcher for the Texas Rangers
 Alex "Xpecial" Chu, class of 2010, professional League of Legends player; currently plays support for Golden Guardians Academy
Brandon Soo Hoo, class of 2013, actor

See also
 List of high schools in Los Angeles County, California

References

External links
 Temple City High School website
 TCHS Rampage website
 Temple City Unified School District website
 TCHS Alumni News Association website

1954 establishments in California
Educational institutions established in 1954
High schools in Los Angeles County, California
Temple City Unified School District schools
Public high schools in California